The Marquette Historic District is located in Kewaunee, Wisconsin. It is largely made up of a residential neighborhood.

References

Historic districts on the National Register of Historic Places in Wisconsin
National Register of Historic Places in Kewaunee County, Wisconsin